Younès Ifticen (born 26 April 1957) is an Algerian former football player and a current manager.

Club career

Managerial career
Younès Ifticen began his coaching career with USM Alger in the 1993–94 season with Abdelkader Bahmane and failed to achieve the ticket to the first division, with a difference in direct confrontations with ASO Chlef, in the following season, Saïd Allik the club president he trusted him to achieve promotion which he have it after winning in Ouargla against the local team, to go to Division 1 after five years of absence. And Ifticen became called in the stands by the supporters "Fabio Capello" because of his way of speaking and guiding the players, and despite the success he did not stay with the club. Then Ifticen spent one season at MC Alger where he led them to the Algerian Cup semi-final and seventh place in the Division 1, Ifticen returned again to USM Alger and the goal was to achieve titles and the beginning was in the CAF Champions League. In his first participation, USMA almost achieved the surprise and reached the final which was lost by the difference of goals from Raja Casablanca. In the Division 1 USM Alger reached the final where they faced USM El Harrach and despite his lead in the result by two goals, but in the last 20 minutes the opponent scored three goals, they loses the final and blames Ifticen for changing the two goalscorers.

Honours

Club
USM El Harrach
 Algerian Cup (1): 1986–87

References

1957 births
Living people
Algerian football managers
USM Alger managers
MC Alger managers
USM Blida managers
JS Kabylie managers
USM Annaba managers
NA Hussein Dey managers
ASO Chlef managers
JSM Béjaïa managers
USM El Harrach managers
USM Bel Abbès managers
JSM Skikda managers
Algerian Ligue Professionnelle 1 managers
21st-century Algerian people